Bernis von zur Muehlen (born in Philadelphia, Pennsylvania in 1942) is an American fine arts photographer. She made Phi Beta Kappa in 1962 and received a BA in literature, summa cum laude, from the University of Pennsylvania in 1963. In 1974 she began photographing the male nude, turning to other subjects in later years. She has lived in Northern Virginia since 1968.

Career highlights 

Variously described as "idealistic", creating "a theater of the mind", and playing on "the transience of beauty" and "the ephemeral quality of life", von zur Muehlen's photographs have been displayed in solo and group exhibitions in public as well as commercial spaces in various parts of the US and abroad, including New York, London, Edinburgh, Frankfurt, International Art Fair, Bologna, Boston, Washington D.C., and in Virginia. Venues include the Corcoran Gallery of Art, the International Center of Photography, the Virginia Museum of Fine Art, the Baltimore Museum of Art, the Delaware Art Museum,  SITES, a Smithsonian Institution Traveling Exhibition, and the American University Museum.  In later years, she turned to other concerns, such as Polachrome positive color film images of children's dolls reflecting adolescent sexuality in modern society. A year-long stay in Nepal yielded the 1990 Terra Sancta exhibit at the Corcoran Gallery of Art.  A solo exhibit at the National Jewish Museum in Washington, D.C featured photographs of the famed Old Jewish Cemetery in Prague. Images of cremation niches in Prague's Christian Olšany Cemetery were later shown in Washington D.C. and in an exhibit curated by John Szarkowski at the New Orleans Museum of Art.

Publications

Anthologies 

 The Male Nude in Photography
 Frauen Sehen Männer
 Male Nudes by Women: An Anthology
 Male Nude Now: Visions for the 21st Century
 Male Bodies: A Photographic History of the Nude
 The Nude Male: 21st Century Visions
 Women See Men
 Women Photograph Men
 In/Sights: Self Portraits by Women
 Family of Woman
 SX-70 Art
 The Story of American Photography: An Illustrated History for Young People

Catalogues 
 Invisible Light, (Smithsonian Institution Traveling Exhibition Service)
 Sacred silences: Photographs of Jewish Prague, (National Jewish Museum)
 Terra Sancta: Photographs from Israel and Sinai, Nepal, and the North American Dessert, (Corcoran Gallery)
 Moves Like Walter: New Curators Open the Corcoran Legacy Collection(American University Museum)

Collections 

 American University Museum at the Katzen
Center for Creative Photography, University of Arizona Museum of Art
The Museum of Fine Arts Houston
New Orleans Museum of Art
Wesleyan University Davison Center
The Polaroid Collection

References

External links 
 Official website
 

1942 births
Living people
American photographers
Fine art photographers
Nude photography
20th-century American photographers
21st-century American photographers
Photographers from Virginia
University of Pennsylvania alumni
20th-century American women photographers
21st-century American women photographers
Photographers from Philadelphia